Graeme P. Adam (born 17 February 1954) is a Scottish curler and curling coach.

At the national level, he is a two-time Scottish men's champion curler and one-time Scottish senior men's champion.

Teams

Record as a coach of national teams

References

External links
 
 
 Graeme Peter ADAM - Personal Appointments (free information from Companies House)
 
 Trustees - Scottish Curling Trust (look at «Graeme Adam»)

Living people
1954 births
Scottish male curlers
Scottish curling champions
Scottish curling coaches
Place of birth missing (living people)